Tastee Fried Chicken (also known as TFC or De Tastee Fried Chicken Nigeria LTD) is a fast food fried chicken restaurant based in Victoria Island, Lagos, Nigeria. It has 14 locations.

History
Tastee Fried Chicken was founded by Olayinka Pamela Adedayo. It began as an extension of Tastee Pot, an outdoor catering company serving Nigerian and continental food at special events. The catering company still exists as Tastee Fried Chicken's catering operation.

In 1997 Mrs. Adedayo incorporated Tastee Fried Chicken and opened her first location in Surulere, Lagos State. She based her restaurant on the business model of the American fast food chicken restaurant Kentucky Fried Chicken, where she had previously worked as a manager. Since opening its first location, it has grown to 14 restaurants.

In 2006, Tastee Fried Chicken launched a partnership with Oando, a petroleum company, that has begun locating Tastee Fried Chicken restaurants inside Oando's service stations. As part of the partnership, TFC will open a restaurant in every Oando filling station.

See also
 List of fast-food chicken restaurants

References

External links
 Tastee Fried Chicken website

Fast-food chains of Nigeria
Fast-food poultry restaurants
Restaurants in Lagos
Victoria Island, Lagos
Restaurants established in 1996
Nigerian companies established in 1996